This article refers to the Zambian political party. For the Canadian conservative lobby group, see National Citizens Coalition.

The National Citizens' Coalition (NCC) was a minor political party in Zambia.

History
The NCC was founded by Nevers Mumba, an evangelical pastor, in 1997, and was known as the National Christian Coalition until being renamed on 19 June 1998. In the 2001 general elections, Mumba was the party's presidential candidate, receiving 2.2% of the vote, finishing eighth in a field of 11 candidates. In the National Assembly elections the party received 2% of the vote, failing to win a seat.

The party was dissolved on 27 May 2003 to merge into the Movement for Multi-Party Democracy, after which Mumba was appointed Vice President.

References

Defunct political parties in Zambia
Political parties established in 1997
1997 establishments in Zambia
Political parties disestablished in 2003
2003 disestablishments in Zambia